Art Metal is an album by bass guitarist Jonas Hellborg, released in 2007 through Bardo Records. It is the debut recording by Hellborg's project of the same name, Art Metal, borrowing the aesthetic of contemporary metal expanded with Indian and jazz improvisational disciplines.

With longtime collaborator, South Indian percussion master V. Selvaganesh, the bass virtuoso explores this new path with three Swedish exponents of the modern metal scene, Jens Johansson (Yngwie Malmsteen, Dio, Stratovarius) and Anders Johansson (Yngwie Malmsteen and HammerFall) and, completing the ensemble, guitarist Mattias IA Eklundh. The music has been slowly brewed over 18 months to find the spaces where the elements of the seemingly disparate musical traditions can comfortably coexist, even gel into new forms of sonic art.

Songs / tracks listing

Personnel

 Cover Art – Magnus Bergström
 Bass – Jonas Hellborg
 Drums – Anders Johansson
 Guitar – Mattias IA Eklundh
 Kanjira – Selvaganesh
 Keyboards – Jens Johansson
 Mixed By, Mastered By – Jens Johansson, Jonas Hellborg
 Producer – Jonas Hellborg

References

Jonas Hellborg albums
World music albums by Swedish artists
2007 albums